Beaufort County Courthouse is a historic courthouse building located at Washington, Beaufort County, North Carolina.  It was built about 1786, as a two-story, square brick building measuring 42 feet by 42 feet.  It was later enlarged with a two-by rear extension and square clock tower.  It is one of the earliest public buildings in North Carolina.

It was listed on the National Register of Historic Places in 1971. It is located in the Washington Historic District. It now serves as headquarters for and the Washington Branch of the Beaufort-Hyde-Martin Regional Library.

References

County courthouses in North Carolina
Courthouses on the National Register of Historic Places in North Carolina
Government buildings completed in 1786
Buildings and structures in Beaufort County, North Carolina
National Register of Historic Places in Beaufort County, North Carolina
Individually listed contributing properties to historic districts on the National Register in North Carolina